Khatunabad-e Mohimi (also Romanized as Khātūnābād-e Mohīmī; also known as Khatoon Abad Hoomeh, Khātūnābād, and Khātūnābād-e Hūmeh) is a village in Jahadabad Rural District, in the Central District of Anbarabad County, Kerman Province, Iran. At the 2006 census, its population was 13, in 4 families.

References 

Populated places in Anbarabad County